Michael Brian Connolly (born July 3, 1989) is a Canadian professional ice hockey forward for the Straubing Tigers of the Deutsche Eishockey Liga (DEL). Connolly has previously played in the National Hockey League for the Colorado Avalanche.

Playing career
Undrafted, after playing junior hockey in the AJHL for the Camrose Kodiaks, Connolly attended the University of Minnesota-Duluth in the Western Collegiate Hockey Association. Named to the WCHA All-Rookie Team after the 2008-09 season, Connolly remained on a point-per-game average through his sophomore season. In his Junior year, he led the Bulldogs with 54 points in 42 game en route to the NCAA Championship and a WCHA First All-Star Team selection.

On April 13, 2011, shortly after his team won the Championship, Connolly signed a three-year entry-level contract with the San Jose Sharks of the National Hockey League.

In his first professional season in 2011–12, Connolly was assigned to the Sharks American Hockey League affiliate, the Worcester Sharks. He led Worcester rookies with 30 points in 40 games before he was dealt by San Jose at the trade deadline on February 27, 2012, to the Colorado Avalanche, along with Jamie McGinn and Michael Sgarbossa in exchange for Daniel Winnik, TJ Galiardi and a seventh round selection. He was then assigned to the Avalanche's AHL affiliate, the Lake Erie Monsters. After two games with the Monsters, Connolly was unexpectedly recalled by the Avalanche and made his NHL debut against the Minnesota Wild in a 2-0 victory on March 4, 2012.

After off-season knee surgery, Connolly missed the start of the 2012–13 season with the Lake Erie Monsters. As a result, Connolly struggled offensively upon his return until the latter portion of the season to contribute with 9 goals for 23 points in 65 games. His rights were not retained by Colorado and he was released as a free agent at the conclusion of his contract.

On July 18, 2013, Connolly was signed to his first European contract, on a one-year deal with German club, Augsburger Panther. In his first European season in 2013–14, Connolly quickly adapted to the larger ice and cemented his position as center on the top scoring line for Augsburg. Despite missing out on the post-season, Connolly lead the team with 28 assists and placed second in points with 42 to re-sign to a one-year extension on February 23, 2014.

In the following 2014–15 season, Connolly was limited to 22 games due to a cruciate ligament injury, and was unable to reproduce his initial success in the DEL. After finishing with 11 points, Connolly left as a free agent and signed a one-year contract with fellow DEL club, the Straubing Tigers on March 26, 2015.

Career statistics

Awards and honors

References

External links

1989 births
Augsburger Panther players
Camrose Kodiaks players
Canadian ice hockey centres
Colorado Avalanche players
Lake Erie Monsters players
Living people
Minnesota Duluth Bulldogs men's ice hockey players
Ice hockey people from Calgary
Straubing Tigers players
Undrafted National Hockey League players
Worcester Sharks players
Canadian expatriate ice hockey players in Germany
AHCA Division I men's ice hockey All-Americans